Khon Uad Phee (since November 3, 2010) or Man vs Ghost is a Thai variety talk show television programme about ghosts and life after death. It's the most famous ghost television of Thailand. The sections of television programme: Clip Battle, Sound Bantao Tuk Phee (Ghost and karma solution by supernatural belief), La Tha Phee (Ghost Hunter) and Kho Kid Chak Khun Riew (Ideas from Mr. Riew)

Broadcast

2010-2011 
Via Channel 7 (Thailand) by Workpoint Entertainment. Airdates on November 3, 2010, until December 28, 2011, 11.05 PM. - 01.05 AM. (UTC+7)

2012-present 
Via Channel 5 by Workpoint Entertainment. Airdates since January 4, 2012 10.35 PM. - 00.20 AM. (UTC+7)

Television moderators

Main(Hosts) 
 Krit Sripoomseth (Krit)
 Kapon Tongplub (Pong)
 Boriboon Chanrueng (Tuk)
 Panrawat Limrattanaaphon (Riew)
 Chenchira Riabroicharoen (Jane)
 Pharanyu Rotchanawuthitham (Taek)

Guest 
 Nong Choosak Eamsuk (replaced Tuk Boriboon) (November 10 and 17, 2010)
 Gift Wattana Kamthonthip (replaced Tuk Boriboon) (December 1, 2010)
 Gung Worrachat Thammawichin (replaced Tuk Boriboon) (November 2, 2011)

Sections of programme

Clip Battle 
Three moderators (Krit, Pong and Tuk) bring each own clip see the ghost in Thailand or other countries to compete. Whose least one will be punished. In several week, it may be have a clip from Thailand people that he will get 5,000 baht.

Clip from Thailand

References

External links
 Workpoint
 Khon Uad Phee Clip

2010 Thai television series debuts
Television series by Workpoint Entertainment
Ghosts in television
2010s Thai television series
Channel 7 (Thailand) original programming